Cynthia "Cindy" Campbell is a fictional character from the Scary Movie franchise. Portrayed by Anna Faris and created by Shawn Wayans, Marlon Wayans, Buddy Johnson, Phil Beauman, Jason Friedberg and Aaron Seltzer, the character first appeared as a high school student in Scary Movie (2000). In the film, whose main parodies are the Scream and I Know What You Did Last Summer franchises, Cindy shares a role similar to Sidney Prescott and Julie James.

Faris would reprise her role of Cindy in the film's sequels. In Scary Movie 2, Cindy is attending college and with her friends, goes to Hell House for Professor Oldman's experiment. Here, her role is based on Eleanor Vance from The Haunting. In Scary Movie 3, where her role is based on Rachel Keller from The Ring, she is portrayed as a news presenter and has a nephew, Cody. After seeing a cursed tape, she tries to break the curse before seven days pass and she dies. In Scary Movie 4, where she parodies Karen Davis from The Grudge, Cindy is working as a caregiver in a haunted house and attempts to stop an alien attack with the help of Brenda.

Up until the fourth installment, Faris and Regina Hall, who portrayed Brenda Meeks, were the only cast members to appear in every installment of the franchise. Faris didn't return for Scary Movie 5 and Cindy was replaced by Ashley Tisdale's character, Jody Sanders. Faris, herself, poked fun at her character's absence in the 2016 film Keanu where she explains that she only appeared in the first four Scary Movie films, not the fifth because she was "too old".
Critical response to Faris' portrayal has been positive.

Character

Personality 
Cindy is a sweet and cheerful character, and soft-spoken and meek at first glance. Originally brunette, becoming blonde later, she is very caring for others, such as striving to protect people like Cody or even the rest of the world from watching the horror tape. (Scary Movie 3) She also shows an interest in animal rights avocation, helping the homeless and protecting the environment. She matures from a clueless teenager to a much tougher and motherly woman, although she still displays levels of unintelligent or tactlessness at times. She is slightly insecure, showing insecurity when others talk about her appearance.

However, Cindy does have a more dangerous and violent side, even when she was a teenager, shown when she punched Gail Hailstorm in the face for telling her that her "ass looks fat." Cindy also has a rather unfortunate track record when it comes to relationships, her first boyfriend, Bobby Prinze, constantly tried to pressure her into being intimate with him and was later revealed to be both gay and a murderer, later attempting to kill her. Her next love interest, Buddy was also rather argumentative and their relationship presumably did not last. Her first marriage to an aggressive and disrespectful man turned out to be quite opprobrious and abusive, resulting in a divorce. Her most successful relationship was with her second husband George Logan, but he later died during a boxing accident.

She is shown to be a good fighter at several moments in her life, employing martial arts skills similar to the fight skills in "The Matrix." She sometimes has brief moments of extraordinary strength, once lifting CJ off his feet out of frustration.

She can also speak a form of "Mock Japanese," which Toshio remarks as terrible as it is just words such as Mitsubishi, Samurai, and Jujitsu thrown together.

She has displayed engineering skills, where after being locked in a walk-in freezer, she escapes by building a functioning Caterpillar 2-Ton tractor out of random things in the freezer.

Family and Friends 
The only people in Cindy's family who have appeared in the movies or are mentioned are her father (reportedly a drug dealer), her unnamed sister, a grandmother and her nephew, Cody Campbell. Both The Sheriff and Principal Squiggman allude to Cindy's mother having been sexually promiscuous. Cindy has been married twice, once with an unknown man and later to George Logan who dies in between 2003 and 2006. Her brother-in-law was Tom Logan. She was last known to be in a relationship with Tom Ryan.

Recurring Gags 
Cindy is one of the few characters to have a running gag about her; the only other character being Ray. This gag revolves around her thin frame, particularly in how she isn't as busty as Brenda Meeks or Buffy Gilmore. When she flashes Bobby in the first film, she is shown to have a masculine torso with gross traits such as a hairy chest with flabby breasts, the ugly sight of her being topless causes him to fall out of the window. While in the first sequel, her fellow college friends are much more shallow and bullying when they compare her figure to Caroline Kane in her portrait. Buddy also calls her "A-cup" after he punches her, and Shorty Meeks comments that her breasts are orangutan-like while the group gazes over Caroline's portrait. While in the third film, Cindy who is now an attractive reporter, once tried to prove a point while arguing about breast augmentation by revealing to her boss and co-workers her now enlarged "twins", which they appear to be more bigger and more natural than Becka Kotler's silicone implants and features a "sloshing" sound of lactation when jiggled, Cindy also wears tight tops to prevent the distraction of males to the point where they throw a wild party, even at her own job. Cindy even excites men whenever she hugs them, such as the brief moment where her boyfriend George Logan pointed out that she is pressing up against him. In the fourth film, a hand was seen trying to touch her chest like what Buddy once did in the second film. In both Scary Movie 3 and 4, Cindy's new breasts are not obvious unless she flashes her chest on-camera; it has also never been implied that Cindy's enlarged bra/cup size was done out of surgery, this sexualized trait is only a retcon along with her blonde hair.

Another brief running gag in the first two movies is during overexaggerated sex-scenes with Cindy. Such as when she finally goes to "the next level" with Bobby in the first movie where she performs the "cowgirl" position on Bobby, which ends with him ejaculating a fountain of semen so strong, that Cindy blasted to the ceiling, and Bobby looks like an emaciated husk of himself. In the sequel, Buddy who is on the brink of freezing to death from after the paranormal activity traps them in the cooler, he cons Cindy who is tasked to keep him warm, by giving him a "hand" which causes him to produce a fire-hydrant of semen that covers half the room while blasting Cindy against the door.

Appearances

Scary Movie 
Cindy is a high school student attending B. A. Corpse High School with her boyfriend Bobby Prinze. Their friends include Brenda Meeks, Buffy Gilmore, Ray Wilkins and Greg Phillipe. Despite being in a committed relationship with Bobby, the two of them still haven't consummated their relationship. Following Drew Decker's death, it's revealed that one year prior, the six of them had accidentally ran over a man while drinking. While the man was unharmed, they didn't notice and after accidentally knocking him unconscious, dumped his body at a pier. Later the same day, she notices Ghostface outside her classroom and a note on her desk telling her that "they know what she did last Halloween". After being attacked by Ghostface, she assumes that Bobby is the killer and gets him arrested. After the real killer calls her, she decides to invite her friends to keep each other safe. Thanks to Shorty, the small get-together turns into a party. After having sex with Bobby, it's revealed that he is gay and in a relationship with Ray. Despite killing Shorty, they reveal to her that they're copycats of the real killer who appears and kills both of them. After knocking him out, Cindy is taken to the police station where she realizes Doofy, Buffy's brother, is the killer. Despite running after him, Doofy manages to escape, leaving Cindy screaming in the middle of the street, only to get ran over by a car.

Scary Movie 2 
One year after the events of the previous film, Cindy is attending college with Brenda, Shorty and Ray, despite all three of them having died in the previous film and the latter having tried to kill her.

Scary Movie 3 
Now a journalist, Cindy has custody of her paranormally gifted nephew, Cody. She again meets Brenda, now a teacher. Unnerved, Brenda asks Cindy to stay with her for the night, when she says she watched a cursed tape. Brenda is murdered by a supernatural girl named Tabitha after failing to turn off the TV. Cindy goes after the answer to the curse of the tape, discovering that aliens are also involved, all while trying to protect Cody and her new friends, Tom Logan, his daughter, and brother George, who becomes Cindy's love interest. After breaking the curse, she marries George.

Scary Movie 4 
Cindy has become broke and lonely because her husband George had died and her nephew Cody has enrolled in military academy.

Over the following day, Cindy bonds with Tom Ryan, confiding to him about George's death in a fateful boxing match. The two realize their newfound love, but are interrupted by a gigantic triPod which disables electricity and starts vaporizing the town residents.

Cindy converses in mock Japanese with the haunted house's ghost, Toshio, learning that the answer of the invasion is his father's heart. While Tom leaves the city with his children, Cindy reunites with her friend, Brenda Meeks, miraculously alive after her death (having been pieced back together by Mahalik). Following Toshio's directions, the two head to the countryside and end up in a mysterious, isolated community. They are captured and put to trial headed by Henry Hale. The result allows them to live but never leave the village. 

Tom and his children drive and find themselves in the middle of a war between the U.S. military and the aliens. Excited with the conflict, Robbie runs away, while Tom and Rachel are taken by the triPod. Back at the village, Henry is killed by the village loon, Ezekiel, revealing to Cindy that he fathered Toshio, who was killed during Cindy's boxing match. Cindy and Brenda are soon taken by the triPod and sent to the bathroom seen in the prologue, and they get stuck into the Venus flytrap. Cindy manages to get through Billy's challenge, but is threatened with the safety of Tom and his children, who are put to traps. Looking at a toilet with the "heart" nearby, Cindy realizes that Billy, through Henry's wife, is the true father of Toshio. Seeing how far Tom would go to save his children, Billy apologizes for the invasion and releases them. Robbie and Rachel are successfully returned to their mother who is revealed to have married a much older man. Brenda also becomes romantically involved with Billy's brother, Zoltar.
Meanwhile, Tom appears in The Oprah Winfrey Show and wildly professes his love for Cindy by jumping around, throwing Cindy, and crushing Oprah's wrists and hitting her with a chair.

Development

Parody and inspiration 
In Scary Movie, Cindy is a parody of Sidney Prescott from Scream and Julie James from I Know What You Did Last Summer. Her first name is a play on Sidney, while her last name is taken from Neve Campbell, who portrayed Sidney in the Scream franchise.

Casting and portrayal 
In an interview with People, it was revealed that Anna Faris beat out about hundreds of actresses who auditioned for the role of Cindy. Keenen Ivory Wayans, director of the first two films, said about Faris that "there was a great freshness about her, because [she] had nothing to lose. She didn't think in a million years she was going to get the part".

Faris revealed that Scary Movie was her first Hollywood audition and that she highly enjoyed working on the franchise as it allowed her to be funny, feeling that female characters aren't often allowed to be funny in films. Additionally, she stated that one of the things she like about the franchise is that "[they] can spoof whatever [they want,] take what's popular at the moment and slide it into a very complicated plot structure".

Reception

Critical response 
Bruce G. Hallenbeck, in his book Comedy-Horror Films: A Chronological History, 1914–2008, described Faris as "the real discovery of Scary Movie, the one performer who tries valiantly to hold everything together".

References 

Comedy film characters
Film characters introduced in 2000
Fictional college students
Fictional journalists and mass media people
Final girls
Scary Movie (film series)